Shirin Ab (also Romanized as Shīrīn Āb; also known as Shīrīn Āb-e Tang-e Shāh) is a village in Shalal and Dasht-e Gol Rural District, in the Central District of Andika County, Khuzestan Province, Iran. At the 2006 census, its population was 109, in 20 families.

References 

Populated places in Andika County